was a Japanese domain of the Edo period.  It is associated with Hizen Province in modern-day Saga Prefecture.

In the han system, Hasunoike was a political and economic abstraction based on periodic cadastral surveys and projected agricultural yields.  In other words, the domain was defined in terms of kokudaka, not land area. This was different from the feudalism of the West.

History
Hasunoike Domain was originally a sub-domain of the Saga Domain, founded for Nabeshima Naozumi, the fifth son of the first daimyō of Saga Domain, Nabeshima Katsushige. Naozumi was assigned holdings of 52,000 koku. The headquarters of the domain were within the san-no-maru (third bailey) of Saga Castle; later a separate structure, a jin'ya in the Hasunoike district of Saga city was erected.

Hasunoike initially had sankin-kōtai and was treated as if an independent domain. However, in 1730, it petitioned the Tokugawa shogunate to be permitted to stop making the expensive trips to Edo, and was consequently was allowed to attend as part of the retinue of Saga Domain.

During the unsettled Bakumatsu period, the 9th (and last) daimyō of Hasunoike, Nabeshima Naotada was he was ordered the Tokugawa shogunate to take responsibility of the defenses of the Nagasaki area against possible incursions by foreign ships, and was forced to raise and train troops, and build coastal defense fortifications in 1854. This greatly strained the already precarious finances of the domain, which could only be resolved by placing the domain into great debt. In 1864, Naotada dispatched troops to Kyoto to assist the Tokugawa forces in keeping public order. However, during the Boshin War of the Meiji Restoration, he switched sides to the Satchō Alliance and dispatched Hasunoike's forces under the command of his younger brother, against the Ōuetsu Reppan Dōmei and Tokugawa remnants at Akita in support of Emperor Meiji

With the abolition of the han system in 1871, Hasunoike Domain briefly became "Hasunoike Prefecture" before it was merged into the new Saga Prefecture.

In 1884, Naotada and his heirs were granted the title of viscount (shishaku) under the kazoku peerage system.

List of daimyōs 
The hereditary daimyōs were head of the clan and head of the domain.

 Nabeshima clan, 1635–1868 (tozama; 52,000 koku)

{| class=wikitable
!  ||Name || Tenure || Courtesy title || Court Rank || Revenue
|-
||1||||1642–1665||Kai-no-kami || Lower 5th (従五位下) ||52,000 koku
|-
||2||||1665–1708||Settsu-no-kami || Lower 5th (従五位下) ||52,000 koku
|-
||3||||1708–1717||Kai-no-kami || Lower 5th (従五位下) ||52,000 koku
|-
||4||||1717–1749||Settsu-no-kami || Lower 5th (従五位下) ||52,000 koku
|-
||5||||1750–1757||Kai-no-kami || Lower 5th (従五位下) ||52,000 koku
|-
||6||||1757–1773||Settsu-no-kami || Lower 5th (従五位下) ||52,000 koku
|-
||7||||1774–1816||Kai-no-kami || Lower 5th (従五位下) ||52,000 koku
|-
||8||||1816–1845||Settsu-no-kami || Lower 5th (従五位下) ||52,000 koku
|-
||9||||1845–1871||Kai-no-kami || Lower 5th (従五位下) ||52,000 koku
|-
|}

Geography
The han territory extended over Kanzaki, Kishima and Fujitsu districts and portions of Matsuura, Saga districts: an area roughly equivalent to modern-day area of Hasunoike district of Saga city in Saga Prefecture, Kyūshū.

See also 
 List of Han
 Abolition of the han system

References

External links
 "Kashima" at Edo 300   

Domains of Japan